Goronwy Owen may refer to:

Goronwy Owen (poet) (1723–1769), poet of the 18th century Welsh literary renaissance
Goronwy Owen (politician) (1881–1963), Welsh Liberal MP